Nouria Benghabrit-Remaoun (born 5 March 1952) is an Algerian sociologist and researcher who serves in the government of Algeria as Minister of National Education.

Her previous function was director of the National Centre of Research in Social and Cultural Anthropology. She was a member of The Committee for Development Policy (CDP), subsidiary body of the United Nations Economic and Social Council.

According to The Economist, as education minister, she favours the use of Darija as the language of education in Algeria. 

She is the granddaughter of Si Kaddour Benghabrit's brother.

References

External links
 The minister's word

Living people
1952 births
Algerian sociologists
Algerian women sociologists
Algerian academics
Algerian women writers
Algerian writers
Education ministers of Algeria
Government ministers of Algeria
People from Oran
21st-century Algerian women politicians
Women government ministers of Algeria
21st-century Algerian politicians